Compulsive dancing may refer to:

Dancing mania, mass outbreaks of dancing primarily in medieval Europe
O.C.D. (Obsessive Compulsive Dancing), the second studio album of singer Sarah Hudson.